Gentry School District 19 (GSD) is a school district based in Gentry, Arkansas, United States.  GSD supports more than 1,400 students in kindergarten through grade 12 and employs more than 220 faculty and staff on a full time equivalent basis for its four schools.

The school district encompasses  of land in Benton County.

The district includes the vast majority of Gentry, all of Cherokee City and Springtown, and western portions of Highfill.

Competitive sports programs include football, baseball, fast-pitch softball, men and women's basketball and soccer, bowling, cross country, wrestling, cheer, golf, volleyball, and track teams, Odyssey of The Mind,Robotics, Competitive Gaming. They also have Fine Arts including but not limited to Choir,Theater,Drama,Art,Music, and appreciation classes for both art and music.

Schools 

 Secondary schools
 Gentry High School, serving grades 9 through 12.
 Gentry Middle School, serving grades 6 through 8.

 Elementary schools
 Gentry Intermediate School, serving grades 3 through 5.
 Gentry Primary School, serving kindergarten through grade 2.

References 
"Once A Pionner Always A Pioneer", "Code Pioneer", "its a great day to learn something new"

External links

 

Education in Benton County, Arkansas
School districts in Arkansas